The Styria Media Group AG, often referred to as just Styria, is an Austrian media company founded in 1869 and based in Graz. The company is one of the largest media companies in Austria, Croatia and Slovenia, and is also present in several other countries. Styria publishes a number of daily papers and weekly magazines, several news websites, and operates two radio stations and a television channel. They also incorporate seven book publishing companies. The group generated a market turnover of 420 million euros in 2016.

As of 2015, the Styria Media Group and the Moser Holding Aktiengesellschaft each own 50% of Regionalmedien Austria.
This company publishes free (advertiser-funded) local newspapers throughout Austria.
The company's original markets are the Styria and Carinthia regions of Austria, where they publish their flagship daily Kleine Zeitung and a number of regional weeklies. On a national level, the company publishes Vienna-based daily Die Presse and the weekly magazine Die Furche.

In Croatia, Styria is the sole shareholder of the major daily newspaper Večernji list and the daily tabloid 24sata. In March 2008 they also acquired the business daily Poslovni dnevnik.

In Slovenia, the company publishes the free daily newspaper Žurnal24 and owns a share in the major daily Dnevnik. In Italy the company owns a majority share in the regional weekly Il Friuli, which covers the Friuli–Venezia Giulia region in north-eastern Italy. In March 2009 Styria also expanded into Montenegro and acquired a minority share in the daily newspaper Vijesti. Around 2015 the company moved into the Styria Media Center in the Jakomini district of Graz.

Publications
Daily newspapers
Die Presse (Austria)
Kleine Zeitung (Austria)
24sata (Croatia)
Poslovni dnevnik (Croatia)
Večernji list (Croatia)
Dnevnik (Slovenia)
Žurnal24 (Slovenia)
Vijesti (Montenegro)

Weekly newspapers
 Die Furche (Austria)

Magazines
 Wiener

References

External links
Styria Media Group AG

Companies established in 1869
Newspaper companies of Austria
Magazine publishing companies
Mass media companies of Austria
Mass media companies of Croatia
Mass media in Montenegro
Mass media companies of Slovenia
Mass media in Graz
Companies based in Graz
1869 establishments in Austria